Suy may refer to:
 Suy, Iran
 Sulfolactate sulfo-lyase
 Sudbury railway station